A list of Italian-produced and co-produced feature films released or scheduled for release in Italy in 2022.

Films

References

2022 in Italian cinema
2022
Italy